Hassi Khelifa is a town and commune, and capital of Hassi Khelifa District in El Oued Province, Algeria. According to the 2008 census it has a population of 31,784, up from 25,118 in 1998, with an annual growth rate of 2.4%.

Climate 

Hassi Khelifa has a hot desert climate (Köppen climate classification BWh), with very hot summers and mild winters, and very little precipitation throughout the year.

Transportation 

From El Oued the N16 continues to Touggourt, and the N48 leads north towards Biskra.

Education 

3.6% of the population has a tertiary education, and another 11.9% has completed secondary education. The overall literacy rate is 72.0%, and is 78.0% among males and 65.8% among females.

Localities 
The commune of Hassi Khelifa is composed of 11 localities:

 Hassi Khelifa
 Menchia
 Nezla Cherguia
 Hamaïssa
 Chouaïha
 Amra
 Merzaka
 Khalaïfa
 Nessaïba
 Sahanberry
 Nezla Gherbia

References 

Neighbouring towns and cities

Communes of El Oued Province
El Oued Province